Vancouver South was a federal electoral district in British Columbia, Canada, that was represented in the House of Commons of Canada from 1997 to 2004.

Demographics

Geography
It comprised the southeastern portion of the city of Vancouver and the southwestern portion of the neighbouring city of Burnaby.

History
This riding was created in 1996 from parts of Vancouver South and New Westminster—Burnaby ridings. It was only contested in two elections.

It was abolished in 2003 and used to re-create Vancouver South and to help create Burnaby—New Westminster. A small portion went to Burnaby—Douglas.

Member of Parliament

Election results

See also 

 List of Canadian federal electoral districts
 Past Canadian electoral districts

External links 
Riding history from the Library of Parliament
 Expenditures - 2000
 Expenditures – 1997
 Website of the Parliament of Canada

Former federal electoral districts of British Columbia